Monoplex krebsii is a species of predatory sea snail, a marine gastropod mollusk in the family Cymatiidae.

Description 
The maximum recorded shell length is 92 mm.

Habitat 
Minimum recorded depth is 2 m. Maximum recorded depth is 146 m.

Distribution
This marine species occurs in the Caribbean Sea, the Gulf of Mexico; off the Lesser Antilles; in the Atlantic Ocean off the Azores.

References

 Beu, A. (2010). Catalogue of Tonnoidea

Cymatiidae
Gastropods described in 1877